Joseph Crook (1809 - 8 December 1884) was a Liberal British Member of Parliament (MP) for Bolton.

Joseph Crook was born in 1809 and was the eldest son of Joshua Crook. He married Mary Biggs in 1856, with whom he had at least one son. He succeeded his father as the owner of J. & J. Crook, cotton spinners and manufacturers, which was based at Spring Mills and was the second-largest employer in Bolton.

Crook was elected to one of the two Bolton parliamentary seats in the general election of 1852, along with his fellow Liberal, Thomas Barnes, who polled slightly more votes. While Barnes lost his seat in 1857, Crook was again successful, being returned with the Conservative William Gray. Both Crook and Gray retained their seats in 1859, being the only two candidates, but in 1861 Crook resigned and Barnes replaced him in an unopposed election. The resignation was because he lacked time to attend to his business interests.

In 1860, Crook authored and successfully proposed the Bleachers' Short Time Act in Parliament, having first attempted to achieve such legislation in 1853. This gave rights to people working in the bleaching industry similar to those given to various other industrial workers by the Factories Acts. He supported causes such as women's suffrage, manhood suffrage, equal electoral constituencies, Irish Home Rule, direct taxation, and annual parliaments. He was for some time chairman of the United Kingdom Alliance and was involved with the Peace Society. He had opposed the Crimean War.

Retirement from Parliament did not end Crook's interest in politics: he was a member of Bolton Council between 1868–71, as well as being a Justice of the Peace and serving on the Board of Guardians. He was also involved in the running of Bolton Liberal Club and in 1869 he founded the local branch of the National Education League. Among his other roles, he was a trustee of the Bank Street Unitarian Chapel, where a tablet in his memory was erected, although the Bolton Advertiser noted that "He didn't care much for 'parsons' as such, and entertained strong repugnance to the interference of these gentlemen in political or commercial affairs." He was himself a Unitarian.

Crook, who earlier lived at Chamber Hall in Bolton, died at his home, Oakfield in Heaton, on 8 December 1884.

References 
Notes

Citations

Bibliography

External links 
 

1809 births
1884 deaths
Liberal Party (UK) MPs for English constituencies
UK MPs 1852–1857
UK MPs 1857–1859
UK MPs 1859–1865
19th-century English people
People of the Victorian era
Date of birth unknown
People from Bolton
Textile manufacturers of England
English temperance activists
English Unitarians